Giuliana and Bill is an American reality television series that premiered on the Style Network on August 5, 2009. It features E! News host and Fashion Police host, Giuliana Rancic and her husband Bill Rancic, an American entrepreneur who won the first season of The Apprentice. The couple, who first met when Giuliana was interviewing Bill for E! News, were married on September 1, 2007. Giuliana and Bill moved to E!, from the now defunct Style Network, on October 15, 2013.

The response from E! to a question about the show's future as of late 2014 was, "The show is not on our current schedule."

Episodes

Series overview

Season 1 (2009)

Season 2 (2010)

Season 3 (2010)

Season 4 (2011)

Season 5 (2012)

Season 6 (2013)

Season 7 (2014)

Ratings
The third season of Giuliana & Bill was rated .53, marking the season's highest rated rating for this series. It was also most watched with 357,000 total viewers. The season finale on December 20, 2010 tallied the series best rating of a .87 for women between the ages 18–49 and over 600,000 total viewers. The fourth season of Giuliana and Bill attained its most watched season yet with +23% viewers and +11% in women between the ages 18–49 over its previous season. The fifth-season premiere was the most-watched of the series with 528,000 viewers—with 283,000 among women ages 18–49 and 155,000 among those ages 18–34. The season six premiere acquired 600,000 total viewers, which is plus 13% versus last season's premiere. The episode that aired on August 27, 2013, squired 632,000 total viewers, which is +5% over the season's record breaking premiere. Additionally, this marked the Style Network's most-watched telecast to date for 2013.

References

External links
 
 

2000s American reality television series
2010s American reality television series
2009 American television series debuts
English-language television shows
Style Network original programming
2014 American television series endings